Malla is a short version of Magdalena, and a separate given name. It may refer to
Malla Nunn, screenwriter and author from Swaziland
Malla Reddy, Indian politician
Magdalena Rudenschöld (1766–1823), Swedish conspirator
Malla Silfverstolpe (1782–1861), Swedish salon hostess